Governor Lowry may refer to:

Mike Lowry (1939–2017), 20th Governor of Washington
Robert Lowry (governor) (1829–1910), 32nd Governor of Mississippi